Soná may refer to:

 Soná District in the province of Veraguas, Panama
 Soná, Panama, a corregimiento (subdivision of a district) in Soná District